Castrénøyane is the name given to two small islands, Nordre Castrénøya and Søre Castrénøya (English: Northern and Southern Castrén Island), east of Chermsideøya, Svalbard.

The islands were named after Matthias Alexander Castrén (1813–52), a Finnish linguist and traveller. The islands were visited by Swedish geologist O. M. Torell and Swedish geologist and Arctic explorer Adolf Erik Nordenskiöld in 1861.

Islands of Svalbard
Uninhabited islands of Norway